PKP Class Pu29 is a Polish steam locomotive of Polskie Koleje Państwowe, designed for hauling heavy long-distance passenger trains, built in 1931. The designation stood for fast passenger (P) 4-8-2 (u) steam locomotive accepted in 1929.

The locomotive was designed and constructed by H. Cegielski in Poznań. In late 1920s Polish Ministry of Transport ordered two classes of fast passenger locomotives to haul heavy trains in Polish factories, to compare their merits. The design by H. Cegielski was accepted in 1929 as Pu29, and three prototypes were built in 1931 (factory numbers: 198-200). The design was successful, but lost in competition to more compact 2-8-2 Pt31 by Fablok, which better suited Polish turntables, and no further orders followed. 

The three locomotives served in PKP as Pu29 class, hauling mostly transit trains between Germany and East Prussia.

During World War II, two locomotives were captured by the Germans and impressed into service as DRG class 122, with numbers 201 and 202. The latter locomotive was scrapped in West Germany in 1952. Pu29-2 was captured by the Soviets in Poland in 1939 and converted to broad gauge by 1941, transliterated as ПУ-29 class. Possibly it worked until 1958. 

After World War II, Poland reclaimed one locomotive 12.201, former Pu29-3. At first it was mistakenly counted as Pt31-46, and from 1950 as Pu29-1. It served until 1970, then avoided scrapping, and finally was preserved in Warsaw Railway Museum.

References

 

Railway locomotives introduced in 1931
Pu29
4-8-2 locomotives
Standard gauge locomotives of Poland